Events in the year 1856 in India.

Incumbents
Queen Victoria,  Monarch of United Kingdom.
James Broun-Ramsay, 1st Marquess of Dalhousie, Governor-General of India (since 12 January 1848)
Charles Canning, 1st Earl Canning, Governor-General of India  (till 21 March 1862)

Events
11 February– Nawab Wajid Ali Shah deposed. He was last King of Oudh State, reigned 13 February 1847 – 11 February 1856. Annexation of the Kingdom of Oudh
28 February – End the tenure of Governor-General of India James Broun-Ramsay, 1st Marquess of Dalhousie.
28 February – Charles Canning, 1st Earl Canning became Governor-General of India (till 21 March 1862)
25 July – Hindu Widows' Remarriage Act, 1856

Law
Indian Bills of Lading Act
Foreign Tribunals Evidence Act (British statute)

Births
4 March – Toru Dutt, poet (died 1877).
1 April – Acacio Gabriel Viegas, Goan physician (died 1933)
14 June – Ahmed Rida Khan, Sunni Muslim scholar and founder of Barelwi school of thought (died 1921).
23 July – Bal Gangadhar Tilak, nationalist, social reformer and independence fighter (died 1920).
20 August – Narayana Guru (died 1928)

Deaths

 
India
Years of the 19th century in India